Martinchel is a Portuguese freguesia ("civil parish"), located in Abrantes Municipality, in Santarém District. The population in 2011 was 604, in an area of 17.07 km².

References

Freguesias of Abrantes